Fisihasion Ghebreyesus (born 27 February 1941) is an Ethiopian former cyclist. He competed at the 1964, 1968 and 1972 Summer Olympics.

References

External links
 

1941 births
Living people
Ethiopian male cyclists
Olympic cyclists of Ethiopia
Cyclists at the 1964 Summer Olympics
Cyclists at the 1968 Summer Olympics
Cyclists at the 1972 Summer Olympics
Sportspeople from Asmara
20th-century Ethiopian people